The 15th Canadian Film Awards were held on May 10, 1963 to honour achievements in Canadian film. The ceremony was hosted by Jeanine Beaubien.

Winners

Films
Film of the Year: Lonely Boy — National Film Board of Canada, Roman Kroitor producer, Wolf Koenig and Roman Kroitor directors
Feature Film: No entries submitted
Theatrical Short: Nahanni — National Film Board of Canada, Donald Wilder director
Arts and Experimental: Jour après jour (Day After Day) — National Film Board of Canada, Fernand Dansereau, Victor Jobin, Hubert Aquin producers, Clément Perron director
TV Information: Listen with Your Eyes — Canadian Broadcasting Corporation, Philip Keatley producer and director
Les Annanacks — National Film Board of Canada, René Bonnière producer and director
TV Entertainment: Not awarded
Films for Children: Fantastique — National Film Board of Canada, Jacques Bobet producer, Fernand Rivard director
The Climates of North America — National Film Board of Canada, Joe Koenig director
Travel and Recreation: Grey Cup Festival '62 — Chetwynd Films, Arthur Chetwynd producer and director
Wilderness Treasure — Wilber Sutherland, Bill Mason producers, Bill Mason director
General Information: Lonely Boy — National Film Board of Canada, Roman Kroitor producer, Wolf Koenig and Roman Kroitor directors
Public Relations: Arctic Island Wildcat — Spence Crilly Film Productions, Spence Crilly producer and director
Sales Promotion: Partners for Progress — Crawley Films, James Turpie producer and director
Patterns — Williams Drege & Hill, Colin Y. Smith director
Training and Instruction: Mathematics at Your Fingertips — National Film Board of Canada, Joe Koenig producer, John Howe director
Filmed Commercial, Company or Product: Kraft Strawberry — Rabko Television Productions, Don McLean producer
Filmed Commercial, Public Service: Not awarded
Amateur: Cathy — Peter Gerretsen director
Certificate of Merit: Poison — Derek A. Davy, Maurice Stevens directors

Non-Feature Craft Awards
Black and White Cinematography: Guy Borremans — Jour après jour (Day After Day)  (NFB)
Colour Cinematography: Donald Wilder, Nahanni (NFB)
Honourable Mention: Christopher Chapman, Saguenay (Crawley Films)

Special Awards
Four-Line Conics, (NFB) Trevor Fletcher director — "in recognition of its imaginative and experimental illustration of a specialized mathematical concept".
Dorothy Burritt and Oscar Burritt — "for pioneering work over three decades for the development and appreciation of film in Canada".
Gaudry Delisle — "for his many years of devoted service for the promotion of a wider understanding and better use of films for educational purposes"

References

Canadian
Canadian Film Awards (1949–1978)
1963 in Canada